is a Japanese French horn player, composer, conductor, and music educator.

Early life 
In 1969, Nemoto was born in Kamakura, Japan. Nemoto began his musical training at age 3. By age 15, Nemoto began his study in music composition and horn.

Education 
Nemoto earned a bachelor of music degree from the Tokyo University of the Arts, where he was trained by Henriette Puig-Roget, a French pianist and music educator.

In 1992, Nemoto attended the École Normale de Musique de Paris in Paris. Nemoto was trained by Georges Barboteu and Françoise Buffet-Arsenijevic.

Career 
In 2004, Nemoto's composition "Annunciation for flute and harp" received an award at the International Music Tournament in Rome.

In 2007, Nemoto performed as a soloist at the Théâtre du Châtelet in Paris, France.

In 2018, Nemoto was a conductor for musicals such as Cendrillon and Madama Butterfly with Ensemble Musica Nigella.

Music educator 
From 2005 to 2015, Nemoto was a horn instructor at the Conservatoire de Musique in Cachan, Paris, France.

In 2007, Nemoto was invited to teach horn, chamber music, orchestra and conducting at Aichi Prefectural University of the Arts in Nagakute, Aichi, Japan.

In 2018, Nemoto became an instructor at the Conservatoire de Bordeaux.

Discography

Filmography 
 Nana (1926) - Credited as himself in Music Department, musician-horn.
 2004 Le docteur Ox - Credited as Cor/trompette.

Awards 
 1998 Winner of Cor de Trévoux International Competition, 3rd place.
 2000 Winner of International Competition Premio Rovere d'Oro, 2nd place.
 2003 Winner of International Competition "Henri Tomasi" Marseille, 2nd place.

See also 
 Maurice Bourgue - Nemoto's instructor (1999-2001)

References

External links 
 Official website
 Takenori Nemoto on Musica-Nigella
 Takenori Nemoto on Opera Musica
 
 

1969 births
20th-century classical composers
20th-century conductors (music)
20th-century Japanese composers
20th-century Japanese educators
20th-century Japanese male musicians
21st-century classical composers
21st-century conductors (music)
21st-century Japanese composers
21st-century Japanese educators
21st-century Japanese male musicians
École Normale de Musique de Paris alumni
Japanese classical composers
Japanese conductors (music)
Japanese horn players
Japanese male classical composers
Japanese male conductors (music)
Japanese music educators
Living people
Musicians from Kanagawa Prefecture
People from Kamakura
Tokyo University of the Arts alumni